WQAB was a Public Radio-formatted broadcast radio station licensed to Philippi, West Virginia, serving the Philippi/Grafton area.

WQAB signed on in 1975 as the student radio station of Alderson-Broaddus College; in its last incarnation it had an adult contemporary format. West Virginia Public Broadcasting purchased WQAB from the college for $30,000 in February 2017 and converted it to a repeater of its statewide network.

WQAB's license was surrendered to the Federal Communications Commission (FCC) and cancelled on June 4, 2019.

References

External links
 

QAB
Radio stations established in 1976
1976 establishments in West Virginia
Defunct radio stations in the United States
Radio stations disestablished in 2019
2019 disestablishments in West Virginia
QAB